Eleven ships of the French Navy have borne the name Cassard in honour of Jacques Cassard:
  (1795–1806), a   renamed Dix-Août in 1798 and Brave in 1803
 Cassard (1801–1802), a small craft
  (1803–1815), a Téméraire-class ship of the line launched as Lion
  (1832–1850), a 20-gun brig 
  (1846–1882), a steam corvette. She served as Napoléon III's imperial yacht Reine Hortense.
  (1860–1879), a  
  (1866–1894), a 
  (1898–1924), a  protected cruiser 
  (1933–1942), a 
  (D614), lead ship of the s, presently in active service

French Navy ship names